Frederik Ferdinand "Fred" Ormskerk (26 April 1923 – 1 May 1980) was a Surinamese military leader. He was awarded many honors for his military services in Indonesia and Korea. After a KNIL training at Camp Casino, Australia, he arrived in Batavia (now Jakarta). There, he became a soldier in the newly formed Korps Speciale Troepen (KST), led by Captain Westerling. He was nicknamed Bikkel, which means "stud".

In February 1980, the coup d'état led by Dési Bouterse took place in Suriname. Ormskerk allegedly launched a failed counter-coup on April 30 and afterwards was arrested, tortured and killed.

Awards
 Cross for Law and Liberty with Buckle Korea 1950
 United Nations Service Medal with Clasp Korea
 Award of the Korean War Service Medal
 Korean Presidential Unit Citation
 Certificate of Appreciation 38th Infantry Regiment in Korea
 Medal of honor attached to the Order of Orange-Nassau in gold with Swords
 Gold Medal due Prolonged, Honest and Faithful Service

References

1923 births
1980 deaths
People from Nickerie District
Surinamese military personnel
Royal Netherlands East Indies Army personnel
Military personnel of the Korean War
Assassinated Surinamese people
People murdered in Suriname